Exaltation is an outdoor 1981 sculpture by Giovanni (John) Porretta, installed in McGill University's James Sculpture Garden, in Montreal, Quebec, Canada.

References

External links
 

1981 sculptures
McGill University
Outdoor sculptures in Montreal